Noorderpark is a station on the Amsterdam Metro's Route 52 (North–South Line) in Amsterdam, Netherlands. The line and station were opened on 22 July 2018.

Location

Noorderpark is an overground station situated in the IJplein en Vogelbuurt neighbourhood of the borough of Amsterdam-Noord (Amsterdam North). It one of two northern stations of the Route 52, which is running on the North-South Line. This metro route provides the northern borough with direct, rapid transit access to Amsterdam Centraal station, the Amsterdam city centre and the southern borough where it terminates at Amsterdam Zuid station.

References

External links
 GVB website 
 North-South Line project site 

Amsterdam Metro stations
Railway stations opened in 2018
2018 establishments in the Netherlands
Railway stations in the Netherlands opened in the 21st century